Corporal Harry George Crandon VC (12 February 1874 – 2 January 1953) was an English recipient of the Victoria Cross, the highest and most prestigious award for gallantry in the face of the enemy that can be awarded to British and Commonwealth forces.

Details 
He was born in Wells, Somerset, on 12 February 1874. At the age of 27 years, he was a private in the 18th Hussars (Queen Mary's Own), British Army during the Second Boer War when the following deed took place for which he was awarded the VC.

He later achieved the rank of corporal and served in World War I where he was wounded. He died in 1953 and was buried in Swinton Cemetery, Salford.

Crandon Court, Pendlebury 
He is commemorated in the town where he was buried by a sheltered housing complex named in his honour.
Crandon Court stands on North Dean Street, just off Bolton Road (A666), Pendlebury, about 2 miles from his resting place.

References 

Monuments to Courage (David Harvey, 1999)
The Register of the Victoria Cross (This England, 1997)
Victoria Crosses of the Anglo-Boer War (Ian Uys, 2000)

External links 
Location of grave and VC medal (Manchester)
Angloboerwar.com

1874 births
1953 deaths
Military personnel from Somerset
Burials in Lancashire
18th Royal Hussars soldiers
Second Boer War recipients of the Victoria Cross
British recipients of the Victoria Cross
People from Wells, Somerset
British Army personnel of the Second Boer War
British Army personnel of World War I
British Army recipients of the Victoria Cross